Albert Berry may refer to:

 Albert Berry (parachutist), one of two individuals claiming to have made the first parachute jump from an airplane
 Albert S. Berry (1836–1908), United States Representative from Kentucky

See also